Anatole Bozon (29 November 1899 in Chamonix – 24 February 1939) was a French bobsledder who competed in the mid-1930s. He finished 21st in the two-man event at the 1936 Winter Olympics in Garmisch-Partenkirchen.

References

 1936 bobsleigh two-man results
 1936 Olympic Winter Games official report. - p. 419.
 Louis Bozon's profile at Sports Reference.com

1899 births
1939 deaths
Bobsledders at the 1936 Winter Olympics
French male bobsledders
Olympic bobsledders of France
People from Chamonix
Sportspeople from Haute-Savoie